The 2018 Marshall Thundering Herd football team represented Marshall University in the 2018 NCAA Division I FBS football season. The Thundering Herd played their home games at the Joan C. Edwards Stadium in Huntington, West Virginia, and competed in the East Division of Conference USA (C-USA). They were led by ninth-year head coach Doc Holliday. They finished the season 9–4, 6–2 in C-USA play to finish in a tie for second place in the East Division. They were invited to the Gasparilla Bowl where they defeated South Florida.

Previous season
The Thundering Herd finished the 2017 season 8–5, 4–4 in C-USA play to finish in a three-way tie for third place in the East Division. They were invited to the New Mexico Bowl where they defeated Colorado State.

Preseason

Award watch lists
Listed in the order that they were released

Preseason All-CUSA team
Conference USA released their preseason all-CUSA team on July 16, 2018, with the Thundering Herd having five players selected.

Offense

Levi Brown – OL

Tyre Brady – WR

Defense

Chase Hancock – LB

Malik Gant – DB

Special teams

Matt Beardall – LS

Preseason media poll
Conference USA released their preseason media poll on July 17, 2018, with the Thundering Herd predicted to finish in second place in the East Division.

Schedule
Marshall announced its 2018 football schedule on January 23, 2018. The 2018 schedule consists of 6 home and away games in the regular season. The Thundering Herd will host CUSA foes Middle Tennessee, Florida Atlantic, Charlotte, and UTSA, and will travel to Western Kentucky (WKU),  Old Dominion, Southern Miss, and FIU.

The Thundering Herd will host two of the four non-conference opponents, Eastern Kentucky of the Ohio Valley Conference at the FCS level and NC State of the Atlantic Coast Conference, and will travel to Miami of Ohio of the Mid-American Conference and South Carolina of the Southeastern Conference.

Schedule Source:

Game summaries

at Miami (OH)

Eastern Kentucky

NC State

at Western Kentucky

Middle Tennessee

at Old Dominion

Florida Atlantic

at Southern Miss

Charlotte

UTSA

at FIU

at Virginia Tech

at South Florida (Gasparilla Bowl)

References

Marshall
Marshall Thundering Herd football seasons
Gasparilla Bowl champion seasons
Marshall Thundering Herd football